Harold Sebastian "Dutch" Lauer (January 8, 1898 – August 9, 1978) was a professional American football player who played in the National Football League from 1922 to 1926. He played at the collegiate level at the University of Detroit Mercy. He played for both the Green Bay Packers and Rock Island Independents in 1922. He also played for the Toledo Maroons in 1923 and Detroit Panthers in 1925 and 1926

Biography
Lauer was born on January 8, 1898, in Monroe, Michigan.

See also
List of Rock Island Independents players
List of Green Bay Packers players
List of Toledo Maroons players

References

1898 births
1978 deaths
People from Monroe, Michigan
Rock Island Independents players
Green Bay Packers players
Toledo Maroons players
Detroit Panthers players
American people of German descent
University of Detroit Mercy alumni
Detroit Titans football players
Players of American football from Michigan